Headache is a 1987 EP by Chicago post-hardcore band Big Black. The record generated some controversy due to a cover photograph of a shotgun suicide victim whose head was split in half; it only appeared on a very limited edition of the record and was later replaced with a drawing by Savage Pencil. The identity of the dead man in the original album cover remains unknown.

Original pressings bore a sticker reading, "Warning! Not as good as Atomizer, so don't get your hopes up, cheese!" as a frank communication from the members of Big Black to their fans that they did not regard the Headache EP to be as strong as the band's previous release. This also came at a time when major labels were first starting to warn parents that albums contained "explicit lyrics", and while all of Big Black's records contained such lyrics, Headache's sticker was an ironic dig at mainstream music. Copies of the sticker also appeared on the vinyl release of Sonic Youth's Master=Dik EP as an independent music in-joke.

Track listing
"My Disco" – 2:51
"Grinder" – 2:22
"Ready Men" – 3:50
"Pete, King of all Detectives" – 2:40

Notes

External links
 Headache/Heartbeat package (Dementlieu, "ARBEIT MACHT FREI: Big Black Discography") - includes links to photos of limited cover

1987 EPs
Big Black EPs
Touch and Go Records EPs
Blast First EPs